Captain Pushpendra Kumar Garg (born 22 November 1963) is an Indian sportsperson in yachting.
He was born in Sasni in Aligarh district (Now it situated at Hathras district) of Uttar Pradesh. He studied at Sainik School, Lucknow, and the National Defence Academy, Khadakvasla before joining the Indian Navy.

Career
He formed a team with Homi Motivala and won the bronze medal in the enterprise class at the 1990 and 1994 Asian Games held at Beijing and Hiroshima respectively. They were also the world champions in the same class in 1993.
He won the Gold Medal at the 1993 Enterprise Class World Championship in Zimbabwe and Silver Medal in 1997 Enterprise Class World Championship in Goa, India. In 2021 he was appointed as the CEO of Sports Authority of India.

Awards
P. K. Garg received the Arjuna award for best performance in Yachting for the year 1990 and the Major Dhyan Chand Khel Ratna award jointly with Homi Motivala for overall best performance in sports for the year 1994–95 from the Government of India.

References

External links

1963 births
Living people
People from Hathras district
Indian male sailors (sport)
Recipients of the Arjuna Award
Recipients of the Khel Ratna Award
Indian Navy officers
Sainik School alumni
Asian Games medalists in sailing
Sailors at the 1986 Asian Games
Sailors at the 1990 Asian Games
Sailors at the 1994 Asian Games
Sailors at the 1998 Asian Games
Medalists at the 1990 Asian Games
Medalists at the 1994 Asian Games
Asian Games bronze medalists for India
Sportspeople from Lucknow